Vadipatti  is a taluk of Madurai district of the Indian state of Tamil Nadu. The headquarters of the taluk is the town of Vadipatti.

Demographics
According to the 2011 census, the taluk of Vadipatti had a population of 238,453 with 119,517  males and 118,936 females. There were 995 women for every 1000 men. The taluk had a literacy rate of 69.22. Child population in the age group below 6 was 11,086 Males and 10,601 Females.

References 

Taluks of Madurai district